The Hidden Spring is a 1917 American silent adventure film directed by E. Mason Hopper and starring Harold Lockwood, Vera Sisson and Herbert Standing.

Cast
 Harold Lockwood as Donald Keeth 
 Vera Sisson as Thora Erickson 
 Herbert Standing as Quartus Hembly 
 Lester Cuneo as Bill Wheeler 
 Doc Crane as Daniel Kerston 
 Arthur Millett as Olaf Erickson
 Billie West as Undetermined Role 
 Claire Anderson as Undetermined Role

References

Bibliography
 Robert B. Connelly. The Silents: Silent Feature Films, 1910-36, Volume 40, Issue 2. December Press, 1998.

External links
 

1917 films
1917 adventure films
American silent feature films
American adventure films
American black-and-white films
Films directed by E. Mason Hopper
Metro Pictures films
1910s English-language films
1910s American films
Silent adventure films